Rebel and the Reason is the first extended play (EP) by British-Australian recording artist Reece Mastin, released through Social Family Records on 1 May 2015. The five-track EP contains the single of the same name and four new tracks.
The EP was described as ‘an edgier, rock-laden new sound’ lying dormant in Reece. Mastin said, "I can definitely say that this is completely 100% me and I couldn't be happier with how it's turned out."

Release and reception
The EP was then released both digitally and physically on 1 May 2015.

Aneta Grulichova of TheMusic.com.au awarded Rebel and the Reason three-and-a-half stars out of five and said "Aussie rocker Reece Mastin is back and better than ever… replacing his chatty pop songs with a more mature indie-rock sound".

Track listing

Charts

Credits
Backing vocals – Gary Pinto, Joel Cangy, Mitch Rodgers, Ruby Rodgers
Backing vocals, percussion – Mahalia Barnes
Drums – Warren Trout
Guitar – Franco Raggatt
Additional instrumentation, additional production – Ben Rodgers, Jean-Paul Fung, Mitch Rodgers
Keyboards, bass, guitar – Ben Rodgers

Release history

References

2015 debut EPs
EPs by Australian artists